The 1969 Washington Senators season involved the Senators finishing 4th in the newly established American League East with a record of 86 wins and 76 losses.

Offseason 
 January 8, 1969: John Orsino was purchased from the Senators by the New York Yankees.

Regular season 
The year 1969 was a turning point in Washington sports history. The Senators named Ted Williams as manager. The Washington Redskins hired Vince Lombardi as Head Coach and he had brought a winning attitude to the nation's capital. In the same year, the nearby University of Maryland had hired Lefty Driesell to coach basketball. It marked a renaissance in sports interest in America's most transient of cities.

The hiring of Ted Williams sparked at least increased curiosity in the team.  Williams' fanatical approach to hitting helped improve the Senators offense considerably, and inspired the team to its one and only winning season during its 11-year stay in Washington. The Senators won 86 games, 21 more than in 1968, and improved from last place in the ten-team 1968 American League to one game out of third in the new AL East division. For this remarkable turnaround, Williams was voted American League Manager of the Year. As a result, attendance at RFK Stadium improved to over 900,000, the highest attendance for the "new" Senators and, at the time, the highest in Washington's baseball history.

Season standings

Record vs. opponents

Opening Day starters 

 CF Del Unser
 RF Ed Stroud
 LF Frank Howard
 1B Mike Epstein
 3B Ken McMullen
 SS Ed Brinkman
 2B Tim Cullen
 C  Paul Casanova
 P  Camilo Pascual

Notable transactions 
 June 5, 1969: 1969 Major League Baseball draft
Dave Moates was drafted by the Senators in the 4th round.
Dave Criscione was drafted by the Senators in the 5th round.
 June 20, 1969: Bill Denehy and cash was traded by the Senators to the Cleveland Indians for Lee Maye.

Roster

Game log

Regular season

|- style="background:#fcc;"
| 1 || April 7 || 1:30p.m. EST || Yankees || L 4–8 || Stottlemyre (1–0) || Pascual (0–1) || – || 2:47 || 45,113 || 0–1 || L1
|- style="background:#cfc;"
| 2 || April 9 || 8:05p.m. EST || Yankees || W 6–4 || Coleman (1–0) || Bahnsen (0–1) || – || 2:00 || 15,162 || 1–1 || W1
|- style="background:#cfc;"
| 3 || April 10 || 1:30p.m. EST || Yankees || W 9–6 || Hannan (1–0) || Peterson (0–1) || Higgins (1) || 2:33 || 3,971 || 2–1 || W2
|- style="background:#cfc;"
| 4 || April 11 || 8:00p.m. EST || @ Orioles || W 4–0 || Moore (1–0) || Hardin (0–1) || Higgins (2) || 2:15 || 8,415 || 3–1 || W3
|- style="background:#fcc;"
| 5 || April 12 || 2:15p.m. EST || @ Orioles || L 0–9 || McNally (1–0) || Pascual (0–2) || – || 2:16 || 6,379 || 3–2 || L1
|- style="background:#fcc;"
| 6 || April 13 || 2:00p.m. EST || @ Orioles || L 0–2 || Palmer (1–0) || Coleman (1–1) || – || 2:03 || – || 3–3 || L2
|- style="background:#fcc;"
| 7 || April 13 || 4:38p.m. EST || @ Orioles || L 0–9 || Phoebus (1–0) || Bosman (0–1) || – || 2:07 || 20,483 || 3–4 || L3
|- style="background:#fcc;"
| 8 || April 15 || 2:00p.m. EST || @ Yankees || L 2–8 || Peterson (1–1) || Bertaina (0–1) || – || 2:32 || 13,889 || 3–5 || L4
|- style="background:#bbb;"
|–|| April 16 || || @ Yankees || colspan="8"|Postponed (Rain) 
|- style="background:#fcc;"
| 9 || April 17 || 1:00p.m. EST || @ Yankees || L 3–7  || Stottlemyre (3–0) || Higgins (0–1) || – || 2:28 || – || 3–6 || L5
|- style="background:#cfc;"
| 10 || April 17 || 4:03p.m. EST || @ Yankees || W 5–2 || Moore (2–0) || Bahnsen (0–3) || Higgins (3) || 2:17 || 6,883 || 4–6 || W1
|- style="background:#fcc;"
| 11 || April 18 || 8:05p.m. EST || Orioles || L 0–6 || Phoebus (2–0) || Coleman (1–2) || – || 2:27 || 4,457 || 4–7 || L1
|- style="background:#cfc;"
| 12 || April 19 || 2:15p.m. EST || Orioles || W 7–5 || Bosman (1–1) || Cuellar (0–2) || Higgins (4) || 2:20 || 5,495 || 5–7 || W1
|- style="background:#fcc;"
| 13 || April 20 || 1:00p.m. EST || Orioles || L 1–2 || McNally (2–0) || Hannan (1–1) || Watt (2) || 2:52 || – || 5–8 || L1
|- style="background:#cfc;"
| 14 || April 20 || 4:27p.m. EST || Orioles || W 5–2 || Bertaina (1–1) || Hardin (0–2) || Humphreys (1) || 2:19 || 18,055 || 6–8 || W1
|- style="background:#fcc;"
| 15 || April 21 || 8:05p.m. EST || Tigers || L 0–2 || Sparma (2–0) || Moore (2–1) || – || 2:15 || 3,813 || 6–9 || L1
|- style="background:#fcc;"
| 16 || April 22 || 8:05p.m. EST || Tigers || L 2–4 || Hiller (1–0) || Pascual (0–3) || McMahon (3) || 2:48 || 4,922 || 6–10 || L2
|- style="background:#bbb;"
|–|| April 24 || || @ Red Sox || colspan="8"|Postponed (Rain) 
|- style="background:#cfc;"
| 21 || April 28 || 8:00p.m. EDT || @ Tigers || W 6–1 || Pascual (1–3) || Wilson (1–3) || Bosman (1) || 2:39 || 7,353 || 11–10 || W5
|- style="background:#fcc;"
| 22 || April 29 || 8:00p.m. EDT || @ Tigers || L 4–5 || Radatz (1–0) || Bertaina (1–2) || – || 2:24 || 6,986 || 11–11 || L1
|-

|-

|- style="background:#bbb;"
|–|| June 15 || || Angels || colspan="8"|Postponed (Rain) 
|- style="background:#fcc;"
| 64 || June 17 || 8:05p.m. EDT || Orioles || L 1–5 || Cuellar (0–2) || Shellenback (1–2) || – || 2:26 || 22,134 || 31–33 || L2
|- style="background:#fcc;"
| 65 || June 18 || 8:05p.m. EDT || Orioles || L 1–3 || Hardin (3–3) || Moore (5–2) || Hall (2) || 2:11 || 10,420 || 31–34 || L3
|- style="background:#fcc;"
| 66 || June 19 || 8:05p.m. EDT || Orioles || L 0–2 || McNally (10–0) || Higgins (4–7) || – || 2:04 || 13,376 || 31–35 || L4
|- style="background:#cfc;"
| 67 || June 20 || 8:00p.m. EDT || @ Tigers || W 7–2  || Knowles (3–0) || McMahon (1–4) || – || 3:07 || 27,725 || 32–35 || W1
|- style="background:#fcc;"
| 68 || June 21 || 1:15p.m. EDT || @ Tigers || L 5–9 || Lolich (8–1) || Humphreys (1–2) || – || 2:31 || 25,340 || 32–36 || L1
|- style="background:#cfc;"
| 69 || June 22 || 1:30p.m. EDT || @ Tigers || W 9–4 || Higgins (5–7) || Dobson (2–5) || – || 2:51 || – || 33–36 || W1
|- style="background:#cfc;"
| 70 || June 22 || 4:56p.m. EDT || @ Tigers || W 9–5  || Moore (6–2) || Sparma (4–3) || – || 1:51 || 52,721 || 34–36 || W2
|- style="background:#fcc;"
| 71 || June 23 || 8:00p.m. EDT || @ Orioles || L 3–5 || Palmer (9–2) || Knowles (3–1) || Richert (6) || 1:57 || 7,830 || 34–37 || L1
|- style="background:#fcc;"
| 72 || June 24 || 8:00p.m. EDT || @ Orioles || L 3–6  || Hall (4–2) || Shellenback (1–3) || – || 3:06 || 14,763 || 34–38 || L2
|- style="background:#cfc;"
| 73 || June 25 || 8:00p.m. EDT || @ Orioles || W 11–8 || Humphreys (2–2) || Hardin (3–4) || Knowles (2) || 2:41 || 11,130 || 35–38 || W1
|- style="background:#bbb;"
|–|| June 30 || || @ Indians || colspan="8"|Postponed (Rain) 
|-

|- style="background:#fcc;"
| 90 || July 11 || 8:05p.m. EDT || Yankees || L 3–4 || Stottlemyre (13–6) || Moore (7–4) || – || 2:13 || 22,254 || 46–44 || L1
|- style="background:#fcc;"
| 91 || July 12 || 2:15p.m. EDT || Yankees || L 1–3 || Burbach (6–7) || Bosman (6–3) || Aker (7) || 2:39 || 17,818 || 46–45 || L2
|- style="background:#cfc;"
| 92 || July 13 || 1:00p.m. EDT || Yankees || W 5–4 || Cox (7–1) || Peterson (9–11) || – || 2:19 || – || 47–45 || W1
|- style="background:#cfc;"
| 93 || July 13 || 3:54p.m. EDT || Yankees || W 10–1 || Shellenback (2–4) || Downing (1–3) || – || 2:22 || 31,700 || 48–45 || W2
|- style="background:#cfc;"
| 94 || July 14 || 8:05p.m. EDT || Tigers || W 3–0 || Coleman (6–7) || Sparma (5–7) || – || 2:50 || 23,831 || 49–45 || W3
|- style="background:#cfc;"
| 95 || July 15 || 8:05p.m. EDT || Tigers || W 7–3 || Moore (8–4) || Hiller (2–3) || Baldwin (3) || 2:28 || 16,122 || 50–45 || W4
|- style="background:#fcc;"
| 96 || July 16 || 8:05p.m. EDT || Tigers || L 0–3 || Lolich (8–1) || Bosman (6–4) || – || 2:27 || 21,568 || 50–46 || L1
|- style="background:#fcc;"
| 97 || July 17 || 8:05p.m. EDT || Tigers || L 3–4 || Wilson (8–7) || Cox (7–2) || McMahon (8) || 2:31 || 24,701 || 50–47 || L2
|- style="background:#fcc;"
| 98 || July 18 || 8:00p.m. EDT || @ Yankees || L 0–5 || Peterson (10–11) || Shellenback (2–5) || – || 2:13 || 11,002 || 50–48 || L3
|- style="background:#fcc;"
| 99 || July 19 || 5:00p.m. EDT || @ Yankees || L 0–9 || Stottlemyre (14–7) || Moore (8–5) || – || 2:12 || – || 50–49 || L4
|- style="background:#cfc;"
| 100 || July 19 || 7:47p.m. EDT || @ Yankees || W 4–0 || Coleman (7–7) || Bahnsen (5–11) || – || 2:37 || 16,547 || 51–49 || W1
|- style="background:#fcc;"
| 101 || July 20 || 2:00p.m. EDT || @ Yankees || L 2–3  || Aker (5–2) || Cox (7–3) || – || 3:17 || 32,933 || 51–50 || L1
|- style=background:#bbbfff
|colspan="12"|40th All-Star Game in Washington, DC
|-

|-

|- style="background:#bbb;"
|–|| September 8 || || @ Orioles || colspan="8"|Postponed (Rain) 
|- style="background:#fcc;"
| 141 || September 9 || 8:00p.m. EDT || @ Orioles || L 1–6 || Cuellar (21–10) || Carlos (5–4) || – || 2:25 || – || 72–69 || L1
|- style="background:#fcc;"
| 142 || September 9 || 8:00p.m. EDT || @ Orioles || L 2–3 || Phoebus (13–6) || Coleman (10–13) || Watt (14) || 2:39 || 10,747 || 72–70 || L2
|- style="background:#cfc;"
| 143 || September 10 || 8:05p.m. EDT || Yankees || W 6–1 || Bosman (12–5) || Stottlemyre (18–13) || – || 2:10 || 6,016 || 73–70 || W1
|- style="background:#cfc;"
| 144 || September 11 || 8:05p.m. EDT || Yankees || W 7–3 || Hannan (6–5) || Bahnsen (9–14) || Knowles (12) || 2:10 || 5,389 || 74–70 || W2
|- style="background:#cfc;"
| 145 || September 12 || 8:05p.m. EDT || Tigers || W 4–3 || Cox (12–5) || Wilson (12–10) || – || 2:17 || 9,398 || 75–70 || W3
|- style="background:#cfc;"
| 146 || September 13 || 2:15p.m. EDT || Tigers || W 11–6 || Knowles (1–2) || Timmermann (3–3) || – || 2:56 || 9,921 || 76–70 || W4
|- style="background:#fcc;"
| 147 || September 14 || 1:30p.m. EDT || Tigers || L 4–7  || Dobson (5–10) || Dukes (0–1) || Hiller (4) || 3:58 || 12,114 || 76–71 || L1
|- style="background:#cfc;"
| 148 || September 15 || 8:05p.m. EDT || Orioles || W 3–2 || Humphreys (3–3) || Palmer (14–3) || – || 1:51 || 5,376 || 77–71 || W1
|- style="background:#fcc;"
| 149 || September 16 || 8:05p.m. EDT || Orioles || L 0–1 || McNally (19–6) || Hannan (6–6) || Watt (16) || 2:41 || 8,165 || 77–72 || L1
|- style="background:#fcc;"
| 150 || September 17 || 8:00p.m. EDT || @ Yankees || L 1–2  || Peterson (16–15) || Cox (12–6) || – || 1:17 || 5,025 || 77–73 || L2
|- style="background:#fcc;"
| 151 || September 18 || 8:00p.m. EDT || @ Yankees || L 3–4 || Stottlemyre (19–13) || Moore (8–8) || – || 2:13 || 6,020 || 77–74 || L3
|- style="background:#bbb;"
|–|| September 23 || || @ Tigers || colspan="8"|Postponed (Rain) 
|- style="background:#cfc;"
| 154 || September 24 || 5:30p.m. EDT || @ Tigers || W 8–4 || Hannan (7–6) || McLain (23–9) || Shellenback (1) || 2:38 || – || 79–75 || W1
|- style="background:#cfc;"
| 155 || September 24 || 8:43p.m. EDT || @ Tigers || W 7–4 || Higgins (10–9) || Lolich (18–10) || Knowles (13) || 2:44 || 14,032 || 80–75 || 
W2
|- style="background:#cfc;"
| 156 || September 25 || 1:30p.m. EDT || @ Tigers || W 7–2 || Bosman (13–5) || Kilkenny (7–6) || – || 2:18 || 4,589 || 81–75 || 
W3
|-

|-

|- style="text-align:center;"
| Legend:       = Win       = Loss       = PostponementBold = Senators team member

Player stats

Batting

Starters by position 
Note: Pos = Position; G = Games played; AB = At bats; R = Runs scored; H = Hits; Avg. = Batting average; HR = Home runs; RBI = Runs batted in; SB = Stolen bases

Other batters 
Note: G = Games played; AB = At bats; R = Runs scored; H = Hits; Avg. = Batting average; HR = Home runs; RBI = Runs batted in; SB = Stolen bases

Pitching

Starting pitchers 
Note: G = Games pitched; IP = Innings pitched; W = Wins; L = Losses; ERA = Earned run average; SO = Strikeouts

Other pitchers 
Note: G = Games pitched; IP = Innings pitched; W = Wins; L = Losses; ERA = Earned run average; SO = Strikeouts

Relief pitchers 
Note: G = Games pitched; W = Wins; L = Losses; SV = Saves; ERA = Earned run average; SO = Strikeouts

Awards and honors 
Del Unser, American League Leader, Triples (8)
Del Unser, American League Record, Fewest Triples in One Season by an American League Leader (8)
 Ted Williams, Associated Press AL Manager of the Year
All-Star Game
 Frank Howard, starting LF
 Darold Knowles, reserve

Farm system 

Savannah affiliation shared with Houston Astros

Notes

References 
1969 Washington Senators at Baseball Reference
1969 Washington Senators at Baseball Almanac

Texas Rangers seasons
Washington Senators season
Washing